Balareguramasamudram is a village in the Pattukkottai taluk of Thanjavur district, Tamil Nadu, India.

Demographics 

As per the 2001 census, Balareguramasamudram had a total population of 346 with 165 males and 181 females. The sex ratio was 1097. The literacy rate was 78.9.

References 

 

Villages in Thanjavur district